The 1980 Wilson's Classic (January) was the inaugural edition of the professional invitational snooker tournament, which took place on 7 and 8 January 1980.
The tournament was played at the New Century Hall in Manchester, and featured eight professional players.

John Spencer won the tournament, beating Alex Higgins 4–3 in the final. A second Classic was staged in 1980 in December with Steve Davis winning the title.

Higgins made the highest break of the tournament, 75, during the final.

Main draw

Final

References

Classic (snooker)
Classic
Classic
Classic
Sports competitions in Manchester